The Schleicher Ka 3 or Kaiser Ka 3, is a 1950s single seat training glider, mostly sold in kit form.

Design and development

The Ka 3 and its predecessor the Ka 1 were mostly sold as kits for home assembly.  Apart from their fuselages the two types are very close in appearance, simplicity, weight and performance.  They share a round tipped high wing with constant chord and no sweep, mounted with 2.5° of dihedral and braced with a single lift strut on each side from the lower fuselage to the wing at about one third span. Plain, constant-chord ailerons reach almost from the tips to about mid span and upper wing spoilers are placed at mid chord, inboard of the ailerons.  Both have 37° butterfly tails with straight leading edges and round tips and trailing edges.

The Ka 1 has a ply-covered, rounded wooden-framed fuselage but that of the Ka 3 is more angular, steel tube-framed, fabric covered and slightly longer.  Both have a simple, deep, sprung landing skid reaching from the nose to under the trailing edge of the wing, assisted by a tail bumper.  Their cockpits are under the wing leading edge, into which the clear canopy extends.

The Ka 1 first flew in 1951 and ten were built; the Ka 3 followed in 1954 with fifteen eventually completed. One Ka 1 and two Ka 3s remained on the German civil aircraft register in 2010. One is one display at the Gliding Heritage Centre.

Variants

Ka 1 Rhönlaus Original version with rounded, wooden fuselage. First flown 1951. 10 built.
Ka 3 Development with a slightly longer, fabric-covered steel-tube fuselage.  Performance and weights as Ka 1. First flown in 1954. 15 produced.

Specifications (Ka 3)

References

Homebuilt aircraft
1950s German sailplanes
Aircraft first flown in 1954